Terminus Mountain is a mountain over , standing immediately south of Adams Glacier on the east side of the Royal Society Range in Victoria Land. It was climbed on March 1, 1911, by Taylor and the Western Journey Party of the British Antarctic Expedition, 1910–13. So named by Taylor because it was the furthest point they ascended in this area.

Mountains of Victoria Land
Scott Coast